Magic Round may refer to:

Magic Round (NRL), National Rugby League competition
Gather Round, the Australian Football League round based on the NRL concept